El Cañafístulo is a corregimiento in Pocrí District, Los Santos Province, Panama with a population of 363 as of 2010. Its population as of 1990 was 500; its population as of 2000 was 460.

References

Corregimientos of Los Santos Province